Ignacio Gil Lázaro, MP (born 23 September 1957, in Valencia, Spain) is a Spanish politician who belongs to the Vox Party.

Married with four children, Gil qualified in law. He entered politics in 1980 when he joined the Popular Alliance, the forerunners of the PP. Two years later he was elected to the Spanish Congress of Deputies representing Valencia region. He represented the area from 1982 until 1989 when he served one term in the Spanish Senate for the same province. He returned to the lower chamber at the 1993 election.

In one of his first votes in the 2008 legislature, he mistakenly voted for the Spanish Socialist Workers' Party (PSOE) candidate for Prime Minister, José Luis Rodríguez Zapatero, a mistake that was subsequently corrected.

At the 2015 election, he was placed seventh on the PP list and lost his seat when his party was reduced from nine seats to five in the Province.

Ignacio Gil Lázaro is a controversial figure in Spanish politics. He was a member of the radical wing of the PP and is known for his insults to opposition parties and for being one of the main promoters of conspiracy theories about the Madrid bombings of March 11, 2004.

On 28 April 2019 he was elected VOX deputy at Cortes Generales for Valencia.

References

Biography at Spanish Congress website

1957 births
Living people
People from Valencia
Members of the 2nd Congress of Deputies (Spain)
Members of the 3rd Congress of Deputies (Spain)
Members of the 5th Congress of Deputies (Spain)
Members of the 6th Congress of Deputies (Spain)
Members of the 7th Congress of Deputies (Spain)
Members of the 8th Congress of Deputies (Spain)
Members of the 9th Congress of Deputies (Spain)
Members of the Senate of Spain
Knights Grand Cross of the Order of Isabella the Catholic
Politicians from the Valencian Community
People's Party (Spain) politicians
Members of the 13th Congress of Deputies (Spain)
Vox (political party) politicians
Members of the 14th Congress of Deputies (Spain)